Amiga Reflections is 3D modeling and rendering software developed by Carsten Fuchs for the Amiga. It was later renamed Monzoom.

The first bookware release was 1989, and contained a book and a floppy disk. The book was the manual and had some tutorials explaining how a raytracer works. The floppy contained the software with some models and examples.
Carsten Fuchs extended the software with a more advanced modeler and an animation module in 1992, the Reflections-Animator.

The drawback of the improved modeler in Reflections 2.0 was that the program required far more RAM than before, leaving less free space for scene objects. On a 1 MB Amiga, the 2.0 modeler could only handle about 1,000 triangles (or spheres) at most. With 2 MB RAM, up to 10,000 triangles were possible.

As of version 4.3, in 1998, Amiga Reflections was renamed Monzoom or Monzoom 3D and distributed by Oberland Computer. 

Monzoom Pro was available on CD with the March/April 2008 issue of the German print magazine Amiga Future. Monzoom also became available for PC as Shareware.

Publications

Books

Scientific articles
 - discusses using 3D software, including Reflektions 4.3 (an alternate name for Reflections/Monzoom), to teach ophthalmology and train for retinal surgery.

See also

 Aladdin4D

References

External links

Objects, plugins, images
 Aminet objects and images
 (German) plugins, scripts, etc for Monzoom

Reviews and tutorials
 Brief review in German
 Listing of tutorials (some bad links), mostly in German

Amiga raytracers
3D graphics software